Limbo is an album by the American alternative rock band Throwing Muses, released on Rykodisc in 1996. It was recorded at the New Orleans studio where the band had recorded University. Following a tour for the album, Throwing Muses were dissolved, with Kristin Hersh continuing her solo career and David Narcizo and Bernard Georges working on several personal and music projects including Hersh's. The album, engineered by Trina Shoemaker, also features cellist Martin McCarrick and Robert Rust on piano.

The album cover and liner notes drawings were done by Gilbert Hernandez.

Track listing
All songs written by Kristin Hersh.
"Buzz" – 3:18
"Ruthie's Knocking" – 3:25
"Freeloader" – 3:28
"The Field" – 3:28
"Limbo" – 4:26
"Tar Kissers" – 3:07
"Tango" – 2:57
"Serene" – 2:49
"Mr. Bones" – 3:09
"Night Driving" – 4:57
"Cowbirds" – 3:53
"Shark" – 3:12
"White Bikini Sand" (hidden track) – 3:32

References

1996 albums
4AD albums
Rykodisc albums
Throwing Muses albums